The 136th Rifle Division was a division in the Red Army during World War II. It was formed three times.

1st Formation
1939 – February 1942: On 22 June 1941 it was part of the 23rd Rifle Corps of the Transcaucasian Military District. Redesignated 15th Guards Rifle Division in 1942.

2nd Formation

February 1942 – January 1943: Formed from the 8th Rifle Brigade. Redesignated 63rd Guards Rifle Division on January 19, 1943.

3rd Formation
February 1943 – May 1945: Formed February 1943. The division disbanded in summer 1945 as part of the Group of Soviet Forces in Germany.

References

Infantry divisions of the Soviet Union in World War II
Military units and formations established in 1939
ru:136-я стрелковая дивизия